This is a list of Mississippi Valley State Delta Devils football players in the NFL Draft.

Key

Selections

References

Mississippi Valley State

Mississippi Valley State Delta Devils NFL Draft